Speed Ballads is the second album by the band Republica. Released in 1998, the album was the follow-up to Republica's self-titled debut album.

Release
Speed Ballads reached #37 on the UK Album Charts. The album never received release in the United States.

On 22 April 2023 - Record Store Day - the album will be released on vinyl for the first time, with a run of 1,000 copies.

Singles
The album spawned only one single, "From Rush Hour With Love." It achieved modest success, peaking at number 20 on the UK Singles chart, but spending only three weeks on the chart. The follow-up single, "Try Everything," received only limited release, due to the bankruptcy and closure of Deconstruction Records, the group's label.

Critical reception
The album was met with mixed reviews from contemporary music critics. AllMusic's Jason Damas felt that the album "exhibits some remarkable growth" over its predecessor, calling the album "far more diverse" and highlighting "Try Everything," "From Rush Hour with Love," and "Fading of the Man" as choice cuts.

Track listing

B-Sides
There are known to be five B-sides from the Speed Ballads era. 
 "World Ends in the Morning" (from the "From Rush Hour with Love" CD single)
 "Clone My Soul" (from the "From Rush Hour with Love" CD single)
 "House Special" (from the "From Rush Hour with Love" 7" Vinyl single)
 "Fading of the Man" (From the "Try Everything" CD1 promo single)
 "From Rush Hour with Love" [Westside Story] (From the "Try Everything" CD1 promo single)
 "Ready to Go" [Live from Cardiff] (From the "Try Everything" CD2 promo single)
 "Drop Dead Gorgeous" [Live from Cardiff] (From the "Try Everything" CD2 promo single)

Personnel
Republica
Saffron - vocals
Tim Dorney - keyboards, programming, mixing
Jonny Male - guitars, backing vocals
with:
Pete Riley - drums
Technical
Ian Stanley - producer
Andy Gray - producer, mixing
Clive Langer - producer, mixing
Alan Winstanley - producer, mixing
Ian Broudie - producer
Bob Kraushaar - mixing
Gary Langan - mixing
Ross Cullum - mixing
Cenzo Townshend - mixing
Brian Pugsley - additional engineering
Jon Astley - mastering
Mike Diver - photography, manipulation
Big Active Ltd. - design

References

External links

Speed Ballads at YouTube (streamed copy where licensed)

1998 albums
Albums produced by Alan Winstanley
Albums produced by Clive Langer
Albums produced by Ian Broudie
Albums produced by Ian Stanley
Republica albums
Bertelsmann Music Group albums